Stielhandgranate is the German term for "stick hand grenade" and generally refers to a prominent series of World War I and World War II-era German stick grenade designs, distinguished by their long wooden handles, pull cord arming and cylindrical warheads. The first models were introduced by the Imperial German Army during World War I and the final design was introduced during World War II by the German Wehrmacht.

The distinctive appearance of the stielhandgranate-family has led to them being called "potato mashers" in British Army slang, and they remain one of the most easily recognized infantry weapons of the 20th century.

World War I models: 1915–1917 

Germany entered World War I with a single grenade type: a heavy  ball-shaped fragmentation grenade (Kugelhandgranate) for use only by pioneers in attacking fortifications. It was too heavy for regular battlefield use by untrained troops and not suitable for mass production. This left Germany without a standard-issue grenade and improvised designs similar to those of the British were used until a proper grenade could be supplied.

Germany introduced the "stick grenade" in 1915, the second year of the conflict. Aside from its unusual appearance, the Stielhandgranate used a friction igniter system. This had been used in other German grenades, but was uncommon internationally.

During World War I, the Stielhandgranate, under the name M1915 (Model 1915), competed technologically with the British standard-issue Mills bomb series. The first Mills bomb – the grenade  5 Mk. 1 – was introduced the same year as the German Model 1915, but due to manufacturing delays it was not widely distributed into general service until 1916. Thus, there was a small period of time where German troops had large supplies of new Model 1915 grenades, while their British opponents only had a small number.

As World War I progressed, the Model 1915 Stielhandgranate was improved with various changes. These variants received designations such as the Model 1916 and the Model 1917.

Model 1915 (M15): Stielhandgranate 15 

In 1915, industries of the German Empire designed and began production of the original Stielhandgranate, appropriately named "Model 1915" (M15). It utilized a priming system, unlike the percussion cap pin used in most grenades of the period. The easily recognizable "potato masher" shape is a result of a number of different styles and choices of the design. The grenade mounted a charge head within a sheet-steel cylinder atop a long hollow-wooden handle. To use it, a soldier would simply pull the string downwards, dragging a rough steel rod through the igniter within the fuse. The rod's abrasive contact would cause sparks and a flame to light from within, setting the fuse burning. This fuse took approximately four and a half seconds to reach the detonator before exploding.

The British War Office reported average thrown distance of a Mills bomb as  when standing,  when crouched and  lying prone. One issue that hand grenades of the time had was unpredictable rolling after landing. The Stielhandgranate did not suffer nearly as much. Instead of rolling straight down a hill or across rough terrain, it would instead roll from side to side. However, the larger size and the irregular overall shape meant that fewer grenades could be carried. It also took longer to prime the grenade than Allied counterparts such as the Mills bomb.

The Stielhandgranate primarily relied on a concussion blast effect, its thin metal container creating little fragmentation compared with many grenades of the time, such as the Mills bomb and the French F1 grenade, the later World War II American Mk 2 grenade, and the Russian (later Soviet) F1 grenade. Fragmentation grenades produced shrapnel which could wound enemy infantry over a large area, which made these types very useful in open areas such as fields, the blasted expanse of no man's land, beaches, spacious trenches, and wide city streets.

Concussion grenades, however, were primarily designed to stun opponents at close quarters with the blast of their explosive charge, thereby reducing resistance for the immediately following-up infantry assault closing with its target with rifles and bayonets. The Stielhandgranate was extremely effective and reliable in clearing enclosed areas, such as buildings, fortifications, and the fighting compartments of enemy tanks, although performance in wide open areas was less than satisfactory. The blast effect went only a limited distance before dying out, while pieces from an equivalent fragmentation grenade could fly hundreds of metres (it was not unrealistic to expect that metal shrapnel could create friendly fire casualties, especially in open areas).

Model 1916 (M16): Stielhandgranate 16 
The pull cord which activated the M15 grenade's fuse protruded from the base and could get caught in debris or clutter on the battlefields of World War I, causing the fuse to be ignited, and the grenade to explode on the belt of an unaware infantryman. This resulted in the introduction of the Model 1916 (M16).

Functionally identical to the M15, the M16 changed the pull cord to improve safety. A small porcelain ball was placed at the base of the grenade, attached directly to the pull cord. This prevented the string from being exposed. The small bead was partially enveloped in the wooden handle, meaning that some force was needed to pluck it out. Operation was nearly identical, except that a soldier no longer needed to pull the string itself.

Model 1917 (M17): Stielhandgranate 17 
Another development of the Stielhandgranate was implemented during the later stages of World War I, affecting the priming system. The base of the Stielhandgranate's handle was slightly redesigned, and a metal cover cap was introduced. This cap concealed the porcelain bead and pull cord, allowing it to simply rest freely inside of the handle. The operator pulled the cap off and then pulled the cord as with the M16.

Model 1924 (M24): Stielhandgranate 24 

With the German Empire's defeat at the conclusion of World War I, the collapse of industrial capability and military strength of Germany left many projects and ideas forgotten for years. When the newly created Weimar Republic progressively began to repair both the physical and economic devastation, a slow rebuilding of the armed forces was allowed under the limitations set by the allies.

The Weimar Republic revived the Stielhandgranate, and created a new version in 1924, the "Model 1924" (M24). While retaining the same explosive and fuse, the main distinction between the M24 and the original M15 is a slightly shorter charge head and the removal of a belt carry clip. At the same time the wooden handle was lengthened. The intent of these design alterations was simply for mobility; German soldiers could easily (and often did) tuck the grenade in behind their uniform's belt, held tight and secure. Being slightly lighter, and smaller in thickness, this improved overall use.

The M24 was the standard hand grenade of the German Wehrmacht during World War II. Adapting to the rapidly changing field of modern warfare, German soldiers would carry the M24 directly in front, allowing quick and easy access. However, in the later years of the war it was often advised to carry them in a different manner, as it was very likely any sort of explosion or heat could light the fuse from the grenade on the belt, resulting in unnecessary casualties.

The Model 24 Stielhandgranate was stored in specially designed crates during transport, which could carry up to 15 individual grenades. As a safety precaution, units of the Wehrmacht were advised to only insert the actual fuse assemblies when about to go into combat. Later in the war, however, many soldiers of the Wehrmacht would always have their weapons ready, due to the fierceness seen in the Soviet Red Army in the east and the progressive advance of the Allies on the Western Front. A reminder was stenciled on each explosive charge: Vor Gebrauch Sprengkapsel einsetzen ("Before use insert detonator").

Variants of the Stielhandgranate 24 
The Model 1924 was rather ineffective by itself at damaging or disabling an enemy armored vehicle or destroying fortifications. It also lacked the shrapnel effect of most other grenades of the time. To overcome these faults, various German industries during World War II produced a number of variants that widened the utility and capability of the M24.

Winter variant (K variant): Stielhandgranate 24 Kalt 
During numerous operations of the invasion of the Soviet Union, the Heer found that under freezing conditions the M24's fuse could fail to ignite. In response, a variant with a cold-resistant explosive was developed and supplied to most units deployed on the eastern front (especially into present-day Russia). During production, the metal charge head was marked with a letter K, for German word Kalt (English: cold).

Smoke variant: Nebelhandgranate 39 

The Wehrmacht lacked a proper smoke grenade to allow infantry to cover advances or retreats, or for assaulting a position. A smoke version of the M24, the Nebelhandgranate 39 (English: Fog hand grenade 39), was produced It had a remodeled fuse mechanism and a smoke charge instead of explosive; the smoke emitted from small vents in the underside of the charge head. To make it readily distinguishable from an M4 it had large markings on the head and a white band on the handle. Later, the handle was textured so they could be told apart by touch.

Exercise variant: Übungs-Stielhandgranate 24 
Like most of the forces that took part in World War II, the Wehrmacht produced inert (not able to explode) practise versions of the standard-issue grenade, designed to aid recruits on how to properly throw and operate the weapon during training. An exercise version called Übungs-Stielhandgranate 24 (English: Exercise-Stick hand granade 24) was introduced that was characterized by its bright red warhead with big perforated holes going throughout. The Übungs-Stielhandgranate 24 could be outfitted with an exercise charge and fuze with pull cord that made a bang and puff of smoke to indicate explosion when used.

Alternative use of the Stielhandgranate 24

Improvised "bundle charge": Geballte Ladung 

The M24 lacked effectiveness against hard targets such as tanks and buildings. A common solution was an improvised "bundle charge", officially known as Geballte Ladung (English: "concentrated charge"). The heads of a number of M24 grenades – their handles and fuses removed – would be strapped around a complete grenade, usually with simple rope, cloth, or metal wire, a solution initially invented during World War I using M15, M16 and M17 grenades. These "bundle charges" could be crafted with up to six additional heads around the complete grenade, the most common styles being the addition of four or six M24 heads.

As a result of this cost-effective and reliable solution, the standard infantryman of the Wehrmacht could quickly improvise a grenade with up to seven times the explosive power. However, the added weight made it more difficult to throw, and the increased size meant that it was not practical to carry with one hand and that far fewer could be carried. These factors meant that infantry squads, if faced with an armored enemy, would have to close to a reduced range if they wanted to use the bundle charges. During the early years of World War II, there was little in terms of truly effective German handheld weaponry designed to fight hard targets such as armored vehicles and structures, and even later in the war this style of bundle grenade remained useful to the common Heer infantryman.

Improvised "bangalore torpedo": Gestreckte Ladung 
A different version of improvised weapon using M24 grenades was the Gestreckte Ladung (English: Elongated Charge), a type of bangalore torpedo made out of a number of M24 grenades – their handles and fuses removed and replaced with detonators – mounted to a long stick or plank behind one another with a complete grenade at one end to initiate the explosion.

Foreign use and designs of Stielhandgranate 24 
Separate from Nazi Germany, the Stielhandgranate 24 was used globally during World War II. A number of nations either directly acquired or purchased stockpiles of the grenade, or created similar versions with very slight adjustments.

Spain (spanish version m24, grenade ferrobellum)

China (M24 clones, Type 67) 

China started using the M24 stielhandgranate as a result of the German involvement in the modernization of the Chinese Army during the Sino-German cooperation 1926–1941. During this period the Chinese army would adopt German uniforms and equipment, such as the Stielhandgranate 24.

During the Second Sino-Japanese War (1937–1945), the Chinese designed and produced a grenade based on the Model 1924 which was used by the National Revolutionary Army. Such grenades were the main type of grenade used by Chinese forces during the whole war. The M24 inspired clone was a simple design and was mass-produced in large numbers, not only in arsenals (primarily in the 1st, 11th, 21st, 24th, 25th and 30th), but also by hand with the help of civilians. Hundreds of thousands of grenades were produced each month. There were some variations in the design, but most followed the same basic pattern: A wooden handle with a round or cylindrical warhead and a slow burning fuse. The charge was a mixture of TNT and potassium nitride, and they were generally somewhat weaker than their German counterpart. In 1939, a new design with a smaller handle and much more compressed explosive load began trials. The resulting model was lighter and more powerful and the ordnance office decreed it to be the new standard type in all arsenals.

Just like German troops, Chinese soldiers often bundled grenades together to blast open fortifications, vehicles and the like. Another tactic was to tie a grenade to a long bamboo stick, for example to stick up over a wall or into a window.

After World War II, the People's Liberation Army standardized a variant of the grenade, designated "Type 67". It became the standard grenade for the PLA and was also supplied in huge numbers to the Viet Cong and the People's Army of Vietnam during the Vietnam War.

Japan (Type 98) 

In 1938, the Imperial Japanese Army copied the Chinese Stielhandgranate 24 and produced them at a Japanese factory in Manchuria (then Japanese Manchukuo). These were designated the "Type 98". Unlike both the original German M24 and its Chinese counterpart, the Type 98 was a fragmentation grenade. The charge, however, was weak and only contained  of picric acid (more powerful but less safe than TNT). The weapon had a pull ring attached to the igniting cord, and the fuse delay was 4 to 5 seconds (varying from grenade to grenade). Like the Chinese grenades, it was a crude copy of the Model 1924 and a number of issues plagued its effectiveness.

Sweden (Shgr m/39) 
To catch up in the arms race leading to WWII, Sweden managed to purchase a large amount of German produced M24s in 1939, adopting it as the spränghandgranat m/39 (abbr. shgr m/39), meaning: "explosive hand grenade m/39". Later shipments included wartime changes to the grenades, such as a metal pull cord and cheaper explosives such as nitrolite, leading to four designs in use eventually: m/39, m/39A, m/39B and m/39C. These would remain in use until expanded during the Cold War.

Along the M24s, the exercise "Übungs-Stielhandgranate 24" variant was also purchased, being adopted as the övningshandgranat m/39 (abbr. övnhgr m/39), meaning: "practice hand grenade m/39". They were painted according to Swedish color code with a blue stripe to indicate exercise charge. German ones were painted red. Later on the övnhgr m/39s were modified to use more modern exercise charges, receiving suffix letters per upgrade, eventually resulting in the övnhgr m/39C.

Sweden also produced an indigenous design similar to the M24, featuring a pull cord through the handle for arming the time-fuze, but also differing in a great number of areas, such as having a full metal tube for the handle, a more rounded warhead, and other quality of life additions to the overall design. It was designated spränghandgranat m/43.

Model 1943 (M43): Stielhandgranate 43 

As the war progressed and the Wehrmacht began to lose strength and momentum against the Soviet Union, Nazi Germany began implementing measures to ensure the safety and reliability of its weapons. The Wehrmacht needed to minimize the risk of injury or death caused by faults of its military equipment, munitions, and weapons.

Germany's industrial capabilities decreased as the war progressed. As a result, the production of munitions, equipment, and weaponry had to become easier and more cost-efficient. Some of these, like the Maschinengewehr 42, were more than a success on the level of resources, but many were only simpler and less-expensive versions of an existing item. The Model 1924 grenade was technically "succeeded" by the Model 1943 (M43). This was a copy with a few expensive parts removed or replaced for easier production – and because of this, the original remained in service with Wehrmacht infantry right to the end of the war.

The only significant alterations in the M43's design was the inclusion of a self-contained detonator, meaning that the fuse and the explosive were directly linked. The M43 also utilized an entirely different fuse assembly, very similar to that of the Model 39 grenade, another German hand grenade of the time. This meant the stick no longer needed to be hollowed out for a pull cord as in the M24, minimizing the amount of woodworking required to manufacture each grenade.

Users 

The German Stielhandgranate-series has been used in many conflicts, including both world wars.

See also 

List of World War II firearms of Germany
 List of German military equipment of World War II
Model 39 grenade – German "egg" type hand grenade
RGD-33 grenade – Early WWII Soviet stick grenade
Splitterring – A fragmentation sleeve for the M24 and M43

References

External links 

 German Mod.24 - Mod.43 Stielhandgranate
 German Grenades World War II
 German Hand & Rifle Grenades Bulletin No. 59, March 7, 1944 wartime intelligence briefing
 
Stielhandgranate 43

1915 establishments in Germany
1945 disestablishments in Germany
Hand grenades of Germany
World War I German infantry weapons
World War II infantry weapons of China
World War II infantry weapons of Germany